Tao Jiaming (born 25 October 1985) is a badminton player from China. He was the gold medalists at the 2009 East Asian Games in the mixed doubles and men's team events.

Tao Jiaming achieved his first major results in 2010 when he reached the mixed doubles final at the Korea Open with former partner Zhang Yawen. Since then he has played with several partners. His second partner was Tian Qing and made another Korea Open final in 2011. He is currently paired with Xia Huan. Together they reached the semifinals of the 2011 India Open. He has also competed with Wang Xiaoli and Ma Jin.

In the men's doubles he has competed with Zhang Nan, but they have not competed together often.

Achievements

Asian Championships 
Mixed doubles

East Asian Games 
Mixed doubles

BWF Superseries 
The BWF Superseries, launched on 14 December 2006 and implemented in 2007, was a series of elite badminton tournaments, sanctioned by the Badminton World Federation (BWF). BWF Superseries had two levels: Superseries and Superseries Premier. A season of Superseries features twelve tournaments around the world, introduced in 2007, with successful players invited to the BWF Superseries Finals held at the year's end.

Mixed doubles

 Superseries Finals Tournament
 Superseries Premier Tournament
 Superseries Tournament

BWF Grand Prix 
The BWF Grand Prix has two levels, the Grand Prix Gold and Grand Prix. It is a series of badminton tournaments, sanctioned by the Badminton World Federation (BWF) since 2007.

Mixed doubles

 BWF Grand Prix Gold tournament
 BWF Grand Prix tournament

Record against selected opponents
Mixed doubles results with his most recent partner Xia Huan against Superseries Final finalists, Worlds Championships semi-finalists, and Olympic quarter finalists.

  Zhang Nan & Zhao Yunlei 0–1
  Chen Hung-ling & Cheng Wen-hsing 0–2
  Joachim Fischer Nielsen & Christinna Pedersen 0–1
  Thomas Laybourn & Kamilla Rytter Juhl 1-0
  Lee Yong-dae & Ha Jung-eun 0–2
  Sudket Prapakamol & Saralee Thoungthongkam 1–1

References

External links
 

1985 births
Living people
Sportspeople from Nantong
Badminton players from Jiangsu
Chinese male badminton players